Cardfight!! Vanguard G: Stride Gate is the third season of Cardfight!! Vanguard G and the seventh season overall in the Cardfight!! Vanguard series. It aired in Japan from April 17, 2016 to September 25, 2016, running 24 episodes.

Plot
Kouji Ibuki's Plan G is in effect, and they've located Ryuzu Myoujin's headquarters. It's up to Team TRY3 and their friends to stop Ryuzu's ambitions! However, Ryuzu has a defense force called the "Company", whose members include Shouma Shinonome and Am Chouno! What will happen to Luna Yumizuki after she was recognized as having more Stride Force than Am did? Will TRY 3 trust Am after she realizes her mistake? What will happen to Planet Cray, Vanguard, Earth, Zodiac Time Beasts, and the world itself if the Stride Gate will open? Will Earth be led to a perfect future by sacrificing Cray? The fight to save the Zodiac Time Beasts and Vanguard itself! The second part of Plan G is now in action!

Ryuzu dies but is reborn into the body of a child, who plans to take hold of the remaining 4 Zodiac Time Beasts from Chrono to open the stride gate, to lead the world into the perfect future. To stop this, Team TRY 3, Taiyou Asukawa, and Am must defeat all of the members of “Company”. The final judgment has been cast. And the future of earth and Planet Cray are both at stake.

Main Characters 

 Chrono Shindou
 Tokoha Anjou
 Shion Kiba
 Kamui Katsuragi
 Taiyou Asukawa
 Luna Yumizuki
 Am Chouno
 Kouji Ibuki

Antagonists 

 Ryuzu Myoujin
 Shouma Shinonome
 Hiroki Moriyama
 Sousuke Wakamizu
 Kensuke Handa
 Satoru Enishi

Theme songs
Opening theme
 "SHOUT!" by Mamoru Miyano (eps. 271-294)
"Break It" by Mamoru Miyano - English dub version (eps. 271-294)

Ending theme
 "High Touch☆Memory" by Yui Ogura (eps. 271-282)
 "Promise You!!" by YuiKaori (eps. 283-294)

Episode list

References

2016 Japanese television seasons
Cardfight!! Vanguard